The Very Best of Everclear is a 2014 compilation album by the band Everclear. It is the band's third release with label Cleopatra Records.  The album consists of a mix of re-recorded Eveclear originals and covers of other bands' hits all of which were contained in previous albums.  With an identical track listing, this album is essentially a vinyl version of Return to Santa Monica with a new name and cover art.

The album was released in three versions: green, blue, or clear vinyl.

Track listing
 "Santa Monica" – 3:14
 (Originally released on the album Sparkle and Fade.)
 "Wonderful" – 4:23
 (Originally released on the album Songs from an American Movie Vol. One: Learning How to Smile.)
 "Father of Mine" – 3:55
 (Originally released on the album So Much For The Afterglow.)
 "I Will Buy You A New Life" – 3:54
 (Originally released on the album So Much For The Afterglow.)
 "Everything to Everyone" – 3:21
 (Originally released on the album So Much For the Afterglow.)
 "I Won't Back Down" – 3:306
 (Cover of the song originally released on the Tom Petty solo album Full Moon Fever.)
 "Unemployed Boyfriend" – 4:06
 (Originally released on the album Songs from an American Movie Vol. One: Learning How to Smile.)
 "The Joker" – 4:58
 (Cover of the Steve Miller Band song originally released on the album The Joker.)
 "I Will Follow You Into the Dark" – 2:38
 (Cover of the Death Cab for Cutie song originally released on the album Plans.)
 "Every Breath You Take" – 3:20
 (Cover of The Police song originally released on the album Synchronicity.)
 "AM Radio" – 3:56
 (Originally released on the album Songs from an American Movie Vol. One: Learning How to Smile.)
 "Brown Eyed Girl" – 4:11
 (Originally released on the album Songs from an American Movie Vol. One: Learning How to Smile and a cover of the Van Morrison song from the album Blowin' Your Mind.)

Personnel
Art Alexakis – lead vocals, guitar
Dave French – guitar, backing vocals
Freddy Herrera – bass, backing vocals
Sean Winchester – drums, percussion, keyboards, backing vocals

References

2014 compilation albums
Everclear (band) compilation albums